Ruddock is a surname. Notable people with the surname include:

Anne-Marie Ruddock, British pop singer, best known for being the lead vocalist with Amazulu
Donovan Ruddock, boxer
Joan Ruddock, Welsh politician
Margot Ruddock, actress and poet
Mary Ruddock, (1895–1969), New Zealand businesswoman
Mike Ruddock, Welsh rugby player and coach
Neil Ruddock, English football player
Osbourne Ruddock, Jamaican sound engineer known as King Tubby
Paul Ruddock, chair of the Victoria and Albert Museum
Philip Ruddock, Australian politician

See also
Reddick (disambiguation)
Riddick (disambiguation)
Roddick (disambiguation)
Ruddick